Edutopia is a website published by the George Lucas Educational Foundation (GLEF). Founded in 1991 by filmmaker George Lucas and venture capitalist Steve Arnold, the foundation "celebrates and encourages innovation" in K–12 schools.

Edutopia focuses on six core learning strategies. These are described as "Comprehensive Assessment, Integrated Studies, Project-Based Learning, Social & Emotional Learning, Teacher Development and Technology Integration".

Schools That Work 
Edutopia produces a series titled "Schools That Work" which profiles  districts, and programs and colleges that are improving the ways in which students learn. The series focuses on evidence-based successes and uses how-to videos and tip lists to help develop educational leadership. The producers interview teachers, students, principals, and administrators, and these educators share their resources such as rubrics, lesson plans, assessments, and training tools.

References

External links

Organizations based in Marin County, California
Non-profit organizations based in the San Francisco Bay Area
Organizations established in 1991
Educational foundations in the United States
George Lucas
Project-based learning
1991 establishments in California